The Arnhem land ctenotus (Ctenotus quirinus)  is a species of skink found in Northern Territory in Australia.

References

quirinus
Reptiles described in 2007
Taxa named by Paul Horner (herpetologist)